Ignitor may mean:

a device used to initiate combustion; see Fire making for a list
Ignitor (band), a heavy metal band from Austin, Texas
IGNITOR, an Italian nuclear fusion research project
"The Ignitor", a nickname for Hall of Fame baseball player Paul Molitor
a Skylander from Skylanders: Spyro's Adventure

See also
CodeIgniter, an open-source web framework
Hot-tube ignitor, part of the ignition system of an internal-combustion engine
Outside flame ignitor, part of the ignition system of an internal-combustion engine